Nationality words link to articles with information on the nation's poetry or literature (for instance, Irish or France).

Events

Works published

Births
Death years link to the corresponding "[year] in poetry" article. There are conflicting or unreliable sources for the birth years of many people born in this period; where sources conflict, the poet is listed again and the conflict is noted:

800:
 King Amoghavarsha I, of the Rashtrakuta Dynasty, (died 878), king and Kannada poet

802:
 Ono no Takamura (died 853), Heian period scholar and poet

803:
 Du Mu (died 852), Chinese poet of the late Tang Dynasty

805:
 Abu Tammam (died 845), Arab poet and Muslim convert

806:
 Tung-Shan (died 869), Buddhist scholar and poet

808:
 Walafrid Strabo (died 849), Frankish monk, historian, poet and theological writer

Deaths
Birth years link to the corresponding "[year] in poetry" article:

802:
 Saint Paulinus II (born between 730 and 740), Patriarch of Aquileia and a member of Charlemagne's court

804:
 May 19 - Alcuin (born 735), scholar, ecclesiastic, poet and teacher from York, Northumbria
 Lu Yu (born 733), the "Sage of Tea"
 Ibrahim Al-Mausili (born 742), Persian singer and poet

809:
 Abbas Ibn al-Ahnaf  (born 750), Arab Abbasid poet

See also

 Poetry
 9th century in poetry
 9th century in literature
 List of years in poetry

Other events:
 Other events of the 12th century
 Other events of the 13th century

9th century:
 9th century in poetry
 9th century in literature

Notes

Poetry by year
Poetry